Red Roses for the Fuhrer (Italian: Rose rosse per il führer) is 1968 Italian war drama film directed by Fernando Di Leo and starring James Daly, Pier Angeli and Peter van Eyck. It is also known as Code Name, Red Roses.

Cast
 James Daly as Major Mike Liston 
 Pier Angeli as Marie 
 Nino Castelnuovo as Vincent 
 Peter van Eyck as Colonel Kerr 
 Gianni Garko as Alex Postov / Lieutenant Mann 
 Michael Wilding as English General 
 Mia Genberg as Jeanine 
 Ruggero De Daninos as Major Frenke 
 Bill Vanders as Jean 
 Polidor as Padre Louis 
 Sergio Doria as Captain von Bückner 
 Sergio Ammirata as Bob 
 Gino Santercole as British Parachutist 
 Bianca Castagnetta as Partisan 
 Max Turilli as Captain von Buckner

References

Bibliography 
 Allen, Jane. Pier Angeli: A Fragile Life. McFarland, 2015.

External links 
 

1968 films
Italian war drama films
1960s war drama films
1960s Italian-language films
Films directed by Fernando Di Leo
Italian World War II films
1960s Italian films